Kagagi (stylized KAGAGI, also called Kagagi: The Raven) is a Canadian CG-animated television series produced by Arcana Studio. Inspired by Jay Odjick's comic book series of the same name, Kagagi premiered on APTN Kids on October 5, 2014.

Characters and cast
During the end credits, images of the characters appear on the left spinning in place with their names underneath them, making it easy to discern who they are.

The following are the characters of Kagagi along with their voice actors (Algonquin-language, then English-language).
Matthew Carver (voiced by Eric Wilson) — the teen boy who transforms into Kagagi
Tommy Wetzel (voiced by Jay Odjick and Jean Francois Lovenge) — Matt's friend
Cassie Shannon (voiced by Stephanie Tenasco and Gracie Dove) — Matt's love interest
Wisakedjak (voiced by Crazy Horse Commonda and Ron Dean Harris) — Matt's mentor, the former Kagagi
Nigig (voiced by Fred McGregor and Dustin Elkin) — a pygmy helper of Jak
Eric Kavanaugh (voiced by Joel Odjick and Jack Anderson) — the school bully
Janet Carver (voiced by Annette Smith and Linsey Willier) — Matt's mom
Brute (voiced by Jay Odjick and Nathan Wales) — a muscular villain
Appolyon (voiced by Jay Odjick and Dan Zachary)
Mr. Keeper (voiced by Charlie Morin and Kelvin Redvers)
Philosopher Rex (voiced by Jay Odjick and Cole Vigue)
Jas (voiced by Craig Commonda and Dan Zachary)
Claw (voiced by Cezin Nottaway and Kaylynn Taylor)
Kade (voiced by Jay Odjick and Cole Vigue)
Tori Isaacs (voiced by Misty Whiteduck and Willa-Lee Reid) — helps Matt.
Kore (voiced by Craig Commonda and Dan Zachary)
Candace Crow (voiced by Wanda Thusky and Willa-Lee Reid)
Warrior Spirit (voiced by Wesley Tenasco and Gino Odjick)
Captive Spirit (voiced by Cezin Nottaway and Kaylynn Taylor)
Minion (voiced by Fred McGregor and Jack Anderson)
Pagwoudj Inini (voiced by Wesley Tenasco and Michael Billy)
Windigo (voiced by Jay Odjick and Tyler Nicol) — the main villain
Cashier (voiced by David Burke in English; not credited in Algonquin)

Music
The opening theme is "Electric PowWow Drum", native warrior music by A Tribe Called Red. Other various tracks from the group are used throughout the series. Other library music came from Kevin Macleod. Original music for the show was composed by Lance Cote.

Episodes

Release
Kagagi premiered on APTN Kids on October 5, 2014. On November 1, 2015, the series began airing in the United States on First Nations Experience. In Australia, the show debuted on NITV in June 2016.

References

External links 
 
Kagagi at APTN.ca

2010s Canadian animated television series
2014 Canadian television series debuts
2014 Canadian television series endings
Aboriginal Peoples Television Network original programming
Canadian children's animated action television series
Canadian children's animated adventure television series
Canadian children's animated science fantasy television series
Canadian children's animated superhero television series
Canadian computer-animated television series
Television shows based on comics
Television shows filmed in British Columbia
Fictional Native American people
Fictional First Nations people
Male characters in comics
Arcana Studio titles
First Nations television series
Animated television series about brothers